"Irresistible Force" is a song by the Bee Gees, released in March 1997 on their album Still Waters. The song was written by Barry Gibb, Robin Gibb and Maurice Gibb.

Recording
It was written in 1995, and was recorded in 1996 as a demo and then this song was recorded with "Miracles Happen." This track was one of the highlights in that album with its guitar and synth rock sound. The keyboards were played by Maurice and Robbie Kondor (Robbie also played on other songs in their 1987 album E.S.P..), the guitars were played by Waddie Watchtel and Carlos Alomar (who also worked with David Bowie, Mick Jagger, John Lennon and others), The bass was played by Pino Palladino (A Welsh session player who worked with Simon & Garfunkel, The Who, Eric Clapton, Joe Walsh, Jeff Beck, Paul Young and others). The drums were played by Steve Jordan.

Personnel
 Robin Gibb - lead vocals
 Barry Gibb - lead and backing vocals, programming
 Maurice Gibb - backing vocals, keyboard
 Robbie Kondor - keyboard
 Waddy Watchtel - guitar
 Carlos Alomar - guitar
 Pino Palladino - bass
 Steve Jordan - drums
 John Merchant - sound engineer
 Hugh Padgham - sound engineer, producer
 Glen Marchese - sound engineer

References

1997 songs
Bee Gees songs
Songs written by Barry Gibb
Songs written by Robin Gibb
Songs written by Maurice Gibb
Song recordings produced by Hugh Padgham